Scott MacDonald (born October 24, 1959) is an American actor. He is best known for his recurring roles as Captain Manning on short-lived series Threshold, Burley from HBO series Carnivàle, and as Commander Dolim from Star Trek: Enterprise, as the title character from 1997 horror film Jack Frost, and Officer Gerard from Dexter.

MacDonald grew up in Libby, Montana, and graduated from Washington State University. He received an MFA in acting/theatre from the California Institute of the Arts. He has also done stage acting, including on Broadway.

Filmography

Film

Television

Video games

References

External links

Scott MacDonald at Actorz Inc.

1959 births
Living people

American male film actors
American male television actors
American male video game actors
California Institute of the Arts alumni
Washington State University alumni
People from Libby, Montana
Male actors from Montana